Alexander Hamilton Buell (July 14, 1801 – January 29, 1853) was an American businessman and politician who served one term as a U.S. Representative from New York from 1851 to 1853.

Biography 
Born in Fairfield, New York, Buell attended the local district schools and Fairfield Academy.  He engaged in mercantile pursuits in Fairfield, and maintained general stores in other cities.  He served as a member of the New York State Assembly in 1845.

Congress 
Buell was elected as a Democrat to the Thirty-second Congress and served from March 4, 1851, until his death in Washington, D.C., on January 29, 1853.

He was interred in the Episcopal Cemetery, Fairfield, New York.

See also
List of United States Congress members who died in office (1790–1899)

References

1801 births
1853 deaths
People from Fairfield, New York
Democratic Party members of the New York State Assembly
Democratic Party members of the United States House of Representatives from New York (state)
Burials in New York (state)
19th-century American politicians